Sherkat-e Kharam (also known as Ḩoseynābād-e Madaras) is a village in Chenaran Rural District, in the Central District of Chenaran County, Razavi Khorasan Province, Iran. At the 2006 census, its population was 20, in 6 families.

References 

Populated places in Chenaran County